The 2022 Patriot League men's basketball tournament was the conference postseason tournament for the Patriot League. The tournament was held on four dates during March 2022 at campus sites of the higher seeds. The winner, Colgate, received the conference's automatic bid to the NCAA tournament.

Seeds 
All ten teams in the conference standings qualified for the tournament. The teams were be seeded by record in conference, with a tiebreaker system to seed teams with identical conference records.

The tiebreakers used by the Patriot League are: 1) head-to-head record of teams with identical record, 2) comparison of records against individual teams in the conference starting with the top-ranked team(s) and working down, 3) NCAA NET Rankings available on day following the conclusion of Patriot League regular-season play and 4) comparison of winning percentage versus out-of-league common opponents. Holy Cross was given the higher seed than Lafayette due to having a better top-to-bottom record (by defeating Navy). Bucknell was given the higher seed than American due to having a better top-to-bottom record (by defeating Boston University).

Schedule

Bracket 

* denotes overtime period

References 

Tournament
Patriot League men's basketball tournament
Patriot League men's basketball tournament